The Dunedin Thunder, currently the Phoenix Thunder for sponsorship reasons, is an ice hockey team based in Dunedin, New Zealand and are members of the New Zealand Ice Hockey League. The club plays their home games at the Dunedin Ice Stadium. The Thunder were founded in 2008 and joined the league as an expansion team. The clubs won their first regular season title in 2013 and have finished as runner-up in the playoffs in 2013 and 2014, losing on both occasions to the Canterbury Red Devils.

History

The Dunedin Thunder were founded in 2008 and joined the New Zealand Ice Hockey League, expanding the league to five teams. In their debut season the Thunder finished the regular season in last place, managing only one win from their 12 games. The team repeated their last place finish in the 2009 season, again finishing the season with only a single win. The Thunder improved from 2010 to 2012, finishing the regular season in fourth on two occasions and third in the 2012 season. In 2013 the Thunder claimed their first regular season title after finishing on 32 points and edging out the Canterbury Red Devils only on win percentage. The team advanced to the final against the Red Devils however lost the game 3–7. The following season the Thunder returned to the finals after finishing the regular season in second place. The team however went on to lose for the second year in a row to the Red Devils. In the 2015 season the Thunder finished the regular season in fourth place and failed to qualify for the playoffs.

Season by season results

Players and personnel

Current roster
Team roster for the 2016 NZIHL season

Team captains

Andre Robichaud, 2013–2014
Gino Heyd, 2015
Gints Leitis, Ryan Gruszka, Connor Harrison, Regan Wilson 2016

Head coaches
James van Leeuwen, 2010–2011
János Kaszala, 2012–2016
Matt Hladun, 2017–present

General managers
Drew McMillian, 2014
Pete Hurring, 2015
Guillaume Leclancher, 2016
Alexis Robin, 2017–present

Richard Audas

References

External links
Dunedin Thunder

2008 establishments in New Zealand
Ice hockey clubs established in 2008
Ice hockey teams in New Zealand
New Zealand Ice Hockey League teams
Organisations based in Dunedin
Sport in Dunedin